Lord Charles Greville Montagu (1741 – 3 February 1784) was the last Royal Governor of the Province of South Carolina from 1766 to 1773, with William Bull II serving terms in 1768 and 1769-1771. He also was the commander of the Duke of Cumberland's Regiment during the American Revolution.

Biography 
Charles was the second son of Robert Montagu, 3rd Duke of Manchester. Charles attended Oxford University in 1759 and married Ms. Elizabeth Balmer in 1765. He was also a Member of Parliament for Huntingdonshire from 1762-1765.

His attempts to enforce the 1765 Stamp Act made him unpopular with the local colonials as governor, and led to his departure during the American Revolution. He tried to be favorable with the colonials and American rebels, having pardoned some of the Regulators. However, it was not enough.

During the American Revolutionary War, Montagu began recruiting American prisoners for the Duke of Cumberland's Regiment to fight for the British war with Spanish forces, who were on the colonists side. Charles was captured recruiting soldiers on British prison ships in New York but was released by General Nathanael Greene. Charles even tried to convince American General William Moultrie to join his regiment, but failed.  Charles and his recruits made up the Duke of Cumberland's army regiment, and the outfit was discharged in 1783.

Charles made it to Halifax, Nova Scotia, with his family (and Joseph Marshall). His Duke of Cumberland's Regiment settled Guysborough. He died soon afterwards and is buried in the crypt of St Paul's Church in Halifax. His tomb states that he died on 3 Feb, 1784, still in his 40s. He was remembered as a good and brave man, who was loyal to his King and Country.

Legacy 
 namesake of Montagu Street, Charleston, South Carolina
 Montagu's regiment is the namesake of Cumberland Street, Charleston, South Carolina

See also 
List of colonial governors of South Carolina
Nova Scotia in the American Revolution

References

Further reading 
 Weir, Robert M. "Montagu, Lord Charles Greville." Walter Edgar, ed. South Carolina Encyclopedia. University of South Carolina Press, 2006.
 Robert Scott Davis Jr. Lord Montagu's Mission to South Carolina in 1781: American POWs for the King's Service in Jamaica. The South Carolina Historical Magazine Vol. 84, No. 2 (Apr., 1983), pp. 89–109

External links
 Charles Greville Montagu, 1741-1783

1741 births
1784 deaths
Colonial governors of South Carolina
Charles Montagu
Younger sons of dukes